Flowerhorn cichlids are ornamental aquarium fish noted for their vivid colors and the distinctively shaped heads for which they are named. Their head protuberance is formally called a nuchal hump. Like blood parrot cichlids, they are hybrids that exist in the wild only because of their release. Flowerhorns first emerged for sale on the aquarium market in Malaysia in the late 1990s and soon became popular in many countries in Asia. They are commonly kept by hobbyists in the US, Asia, and Europe. Numerous cast-off flowerhorns have been released to the wild, especially in Singapore and Malaysia, where they have become an invasive pest animal. Their importation is banned in Australia.

Origin 

Flowerhorn breeding dates to 1993. Taiwanese and Malaysian peoples admired fish with protruding heads, known as 'kaloi' or 'warships', found in the western part of the nation. The slightly protruding forehead and long tail of cichlids were prized in Taiwanese society as bringing luck in geomancy. By 1994, red devil cichlids (typically Amphilophus labiatus) and trimac cichlids (A. trimaculatus) had been imported from Central America to Malaysia and the hybrid blood parrot cichlid had been imported from Taiwan to Malaysia. These fish were then bred together, marking the birth of the flowerhorn.

In 1995, the blood parrots were further crossbred with the Human Face Red God of Fortune, which produced a new breed called the Five-colors God of Fortune. With its striking colors, it quickly became popular. Selective breeding continued through 1998, when the Seven-colors Blue Fiery Mouth (also known as Greenish Gold Tiger) was imported from Central America, and crossbred with the Jin Gang blood parrot from Taiwan. This crossbreeding led to the first generation of  flowerhorn hybrids (often generically called luohans in English), which were then followed by subsequent flowerhorn introductions.

Arrival in the West 

When luohans were first imported to the goddlands, there were only two varieties of these fish for distribution: the flowerhorn and the golden base. Flowerhorns came in two varieties; those with pearls (silver-white spots on the skin), and those without. Golden bases also had two varieties: those that faded and those that did not. Among the flowerhorns, the ones without pearls were quickly overtaken in popularity by those with pearls, becoming pearl-scale flowerhorns, which were developed into the Zhen Zhu variety. Within the golden bases, the unfaded ones developed an attractive golden skin in place of what had been the flowerhorn's grey skin.

By 1999, there were four varieties of flowerhorn available in the American market: regular flowerhorns, pearl-scale flowerhorns, golden flowerhorns, and faders. Commercial breeders proliferated, and fish were selected for appearance with little regard for terminology. Consequently, names became confusing and parentage became difficult to track.

Around 2000 to 2001, the Kamfa variety appeared. These were hybrids of any type of flowerhorn crossed with any species of the genus Vieja or with any parrot cichlid. These brought in some new traits, such as short mouths, wrapped tails, sunken eyes, and increasingly larger head bumps. Seeing this, those who bred the Zhen Zhus began line breeding their fish to develop faster and become more colorful, in order to compete with the Kamfa strains.

In captivity
Flowerhorn cichlids have a lifespan of 10–12 years. They are usually kept at a water temperature of 80–85 °F, and a pH of 7.4–8.0. They require a tank of a minimum of 40 gallons, with 75 gallons optimal. A breeding pair may require a tank of 150 gallons or more, depending on size. Being aggressive and territorial, two or more flowerhorns are usually not kept together, but the tank housing them can be divided up with acrylic dividers or egg crates.

There are several ways by which breeders distinguish between male and female flower horns. Generally, the males are larger than the females, but there are some exceptions. Males have the kok, or the nuchal hump, on their foreheads. Males also usually have brighter and more vivid colors. For most breeds, the females have black dots on their dorsal fins, whereas males usually have longer anal and dorsal fins. Females tend to have an orange belly, especially when ready to breed. The mouth of the male is thicker and more pronounced than the female's. One sure way to determine the sex of flowerhorn is that grown female will lay eggs every month even without the male.

Flowerhorn cichlids are subject to several diseases, including hole-in-head disease, "ich", and digestive blockages.

Varieties 

The original flowerhorn hybrid stock are referred to as luohans (from the Chinese word for the Buddhist concept of ). The four main derived varieties are zhen zhu, golden monkey, kamfa, and the golden base group, which includes faders and the golden trimac. They are sometimes referred to as breeds, though that term technically only refers to varieties of fully domesticated species.

King Kong Parrots and Red Ingots 

Blood parrot cichlids were the earliest defined type of cichlid hybrid, whereas the King Kong parrot represents an early stage in the transition to flowerhorn breeding. The blood parrots are smaller, with a bigger head, more protruding eyes, and a V-shaped mouth. The King Kong Parrot is longer, with a reddish orange color, and a dorsal fin shorter than the anal fin. The shape of the King Kong is similar to the red devil cichlid, and, when it reaches a size of 18 cm, the shape of the mouth changes to a triangle with a more protruding jaw. Only 20% of these fish grow to a size of a half kilogram.

King Kong parrots are sometimes colored purple or blue by pigment injection. This practice is unhealthy for the fish, and the color will fade with time. Parrot cichlids fed with natural colorants and attractants naturally develop a red color. With further breeding, a round body shape has been selected, with the dorsal fin and anal fin longer than the tail fin, and the mouth can open and close naturally. These fish have clear eyes, and 90% of them grow to 1 kg or above, with the characteristic flowerhorn head shape.

The Red Mommon and Red Ingot varieties are the most typical of these hybrid cichlids. Both of these fishes are appreciated for feng shui. The Red Mommon is named for its high forehead, which looks like the hat worn by the God of Fortune. The Red Ingot is named for its yuan-bao shape, referring to odd-shaped gold or silver pieces formerly used as money in China.

The Red Mommon and Red Ingot grow faster in the first year, with a size of about 20 cm. They grow to 25–28 cm by two years later. Their maximum size is not yet known, and it is believed that the fish may grow to 30 cm or above in the future. Both of these fish are raised at 28 °C water temperature, pH ~6–8 (with slightly acid water preferred), and kH ~3–6, while avoiding any sudden change in water quality. It is also common to test regularly for ammonia and nitrite. Both of these fishes can be bred with different kinds of cichlids.

Golden Monkey 

The genuine Golden Monkey (also called Good Fortune) or Kamalau was bred by Lam Seah and Lam Soon in Bercham, Ipoh, Malaysia. After the third generation, all of them were sold to the A-1 Aquarium in 2001. This type of flowerhorn is an original luohan-based fish and not a mixed-type Zen Zhu or Kamfa.

It can be a particularly expensive flowerhorn, carrying a price tag of more than one thousand dollars. The most expensive Golden Monkey was sold for $600,000 dollars during a Malaysian exhibition in 2009.

Kamfa 

This variety originated directly from the luohan. Its main characteristics are white or yellow eyes (red eyes are possible but not common), a strong caudal fin, other strong and short fins, sunken eyes, no underbites or overbites, and smaller lips than the Zhen Zhu. This variety generally also has a larger and more square body than that of the Zhen Zhu. Head flowers can be found on the Kamfa, but not as prominently as with Zhen Zhus.

Zhen Zhu 
This variety originated slightly after the Kamfa, derived from the luohan. It has a rounded tail, large mouth, red protruding eyes, and a prominent head flower. Zhen Zhu means 'pearl flowerhorn'. This variety's strongest characteristic is pearling. Breeders often cross other types with Zhen Zhus because they breed easily and can create better pearling (flowerline) for the next generation. Weak tails can also carry over, however.

Golden base 

Golden base is a group of multiple varieties, including Faders and Golden Trimac.  Faders are called by that name because during the juvenile period of life they first lose their color and go completely black then, as the fading process continues, the black fades away, leaving a more vibrant color, usually yellow or red.

Red Texas cichlids are related to the golden base family of flowerhorns. They were originally created by breeding a green Texas cichlid with a Mommon or King Kong parrot, then crossing the offspring back to the parents until a consistent red color was achieved. Hobbyists consider the most important feature of the red Texas to be the color. Red Texas cichlids range in colors, and are rated as:

 Unfaded: lowest grade of red Texas.
 Yellow: second lowest grade.
 Orange: the majority of red Texas fall into this category.
 Coral: pinkish but not quite full red.
 Red: most desirable color.

The second characteristic that sets the red Texas apart is the pearling. Red Texas can vary greatly in terms of the type of pearling.

King Kamfa 

From the Kamfa family, these Flowerhorns are known for their massive nuchal humps, also called a kok, and their strikingly varied patterning. This fish typically has white or yellow sunken eyes, although red eyes are possible but rare. Distinctive features of this strain include an intense black double flower row along the lateral line, and very thick white pearling. Originating in Thailand, this strain has seen a recent rebirth in Vietnam. The body is typical of a Kamfa, with a fan tail, and a longer body than some other Kamfas. King Kamfa is the most expensive flowerhorn strain.

Kamfamalau 

This is a cross of a Kamfa male and a Malau female. The body and face resemble a typical Kamfa (see above). The finnage and sunken eyes reflect the Kamfa genes. The main feature of a Kamfamalau is the pearling. Fins typically take on a "frosted" pearl look that is rarely found in any other varieties of flowerhorn. Pearling usually crosses all the way across the head bump, another rarity in flowerhorn varieties. This strain should display the best characteristics of both Kamfa and Malau.

Thai Silk 
The Thai Silk, also known as Titanium, is a relatively new strain which is almost completely metallic blue, gold, or white. Its origins are unclear. A new strain of Thai silk has been developed more square body shape like a Kamfa but their eyes can be red, yellow and white. It was believed to be a cross between White Tigers (Texas lineage), pure Texas cichlid and a Vieja.

Strains 

A strain is a more specific subset within a particular variety. Strains can get as narrowly defined as all coming from one individual parent fish. Strains can also differ by country of origin and by breeder.

JPG or Golden Apple 
Created by Ah Soon of Malaysia, these fish are characterized by a large stocky body, as well as metallic pearling.

IndoMalau 

These were created by the Indonesian Luohan Club (ILC), using a Golden Monkey (or Malau) female and a Zhen Zhu male. The second generation was spawned from the Elvis selection and a Golden Monkey female. The strain is characterized by extensive pearling all over the body, face, and head. What distinguishes an IndoMalau's pearls from that of a Zhen Zhu or a King Kamfa is that they are extremely fine. As the fish ages, the pearls become more intricately woven and thinner. Flowerlines vary dramatically; some only have a few flower spots. Most ILC IndoMalaus will include some singular flowers on the back line or "top row". The front half of the fish, from the pectoral fins forwards, is red. The back half is a golden gradient intensifying in color towards the tail. The body is very wide and high, a throwback to the original luohan. There is a very pronounced chin or "gobbler". The head is usually forward-protruding.  The tail is fan-shaped, close to that of a Kamfa. The dorsal and anal fins lack trailers, a common trait found also in Zhen Zhu. The caudal peduncle is very large and pronounced in this strain.

Tan King 
This strain was created by a Mr. Tan of Vietnam, by crossing a Zhen Zhu with a Kamfa. It has pearls and a flowerline like a King Kamfa, but the body and fins are more closely related to the Zhen Zhu. Most have protruding eyes and a more rounded tail like a Zhen Zhu.

Strains developed in the United States
New flowerhorn strains have been developed through breeding programs in the United States. Although it is hard for the US to compete with Asia's well established flowerhorn breeding farms, strains with unique genetics have been created.

Gallery of early flowerhorn strains

Criticism 
Flowerhorns have been criticized by cichlid hobbyists and environmentalists for a number of reasons. Interest in flowerhorns resulted in culling of surplus and deformed fish, some of which were dumped in the wild in Malaysia and Singapore, where they survived and disrupted riverine and pond ecosystems. Like many other cichlids, flowerhorns are aggressive and can breed quickly, competing with and eating native fish.

Flowerhorn breeding contributes to the commercial demand for new and different fish, leading to unethical practices such as breeding for anatomical deformities, as occurred in goldfish breeding.

Within the aquarium hobby, flowerhorns are not favored because of the difficulty of breeding them. The majority of flowerhorn males are sterile (cannot reproduce), so finding one that can is time consuming. Hobbyists have to wait until 8–10 months for a male fish to reach sexual maturity then pair it with a female to test fertility.

See also 

 List of animals with humps

References

Fish hybrids
Fishkeeping
Cichlidae